Apichatpong Weerasethakul is a Thai independent film director, screenwriter, and film producer. Working outside the strict confines of the Thai film studio system, Apichatpong has directed several features and dozens of short films. Friends and fans sometimes refer to him as "Joe" (a nickname that he, like many with similarly long Thai names, has adopted out of convenience).

His feature films include Uncle Boonmee Who Can Recall His Past Lives, winner of the 2010 Cannes Film Festival Palme d'Or prize; Tropical Malady, which won a jury prize at the 2004 Cannes Film Festival; Blissfully Yours, which won the top prize in the Un Certain Regard program at the 2002 Cannes Film Festival; Syndromes and a Century, which premiered at the 63rd Venice Film Festival and was the first Thai film to be entered in competition there; and Cemetery of Splendour, which premiered in the Un Certain Regard section of the 2015 Cannes Film Festival to critical acclaim. Apichatpong has received numerous additional accolades, including the 2016 Principal Prince Claus Award and the eighth edition of the Artes Mundi Prize. His first English-language film was Memoria, a 2021 international collaboration set in Colombia. 

Themes reflected in his films include dreams, nature, sexuality (including his own homosexuality), and Western perceptions of Thailand and Asia, and his films display a preference for unconventional narrative structures and for working with non-actors. 

Apichatpong has also widely exhibited in galleries, including FACT in Liverpool, and the BFI Gallery in London, the contemporary art space within BFI Southbank.

Early life and education 
Apichatpong was born in Bangkok, Thailand to a Thai Chinese family. Both his parents had been physicians who worked in a hospital in Khon Kaen, while his grandparents came from Canton. However Apichatpong never learned to speak Chinese as his father died when he was young.

Apichatpong grew up in a traditional Buddhist family, exposed to rituals that incorporate animism and Hinduism, spiritual practices retained in the surrealist tones of his works today. Among the filmmaker's early influences are the Dada movement and Joseph Cornell's "boxes".

Apichatpong attended Khon Kaen University and received a bachelor's degree in architecture in 1994. He made his first short film, Bullet, in 1993. He attended the School of the Art Institute of Chicago and received a Master of Fine Arts in filmmaking in 1997.

Career

Apichatpong's feature-length debut, Dokfa nai meuman (Mysterious Object at Noon) is a documentary and was conceptually based upon the "exquisite corpse" game invented by surrealists. He co-founded the production company, Kick the Machine, in 1999, and uses the company as a vehicle for his own works, alongside Thai experimental films and video. The list of other founders includes Gridthiya Gaweewong and Suaraya Weerasethakul and the company co-organised the Bangkok Experimental Film Festival in 1999, 2001, 2005 and 2008.

Blissfully Yours, Tropical Malady

Apichatpong's 2002 film Sud Sanaeha (Blissfully Yours) was his debut narrative feature film and was awarded the Un Certain Regard prize at the 2002 Cannes Film Festival, though it was censored in his native Thailand. His 2004 Sud Pralad (Tropical Malady) won a Jury Prize from the same festival.

Between Blissfully Yours and Tropical Malady, Apichatpong co-directed The Adventure of Iron Pussy with artist Michael Shaowanasai, who starred as the main character, a transvestite secret agent, while pop singer Krissada Terrence, better known as Noi from the Thai band Pru, portrayed the male lead. The low-budget, digital movie was a spoof of Thai films of the 1960s and 1970s, particularly the musicals and action films of Mitr Chaibancha and Petchara Chaowarat. The Adventure of Iron Pussy was screened at the Berlin Film Festival in 2004. When asked about the film in May 2013, Apichatpong said: "I have had enough of Iron Pussy for now. I was having a good time making it but I was not inspired."

Along with his features, Apichatpong is also known for his short films, videoworks and installations. For the 2005 Jeonju International Film Festival, he was commissioned to contribute to the Three Digital Short Films project, alongside two other Asian directors. His film was called Worldly Desires, while Japanese filmmaker Shinya Tsukamoto made Vital, Bullet Ballet and Song Il-gon from South Korea created Magician(s).

In 2005 Apichatpong served as the consultant on the Tsunami Digital Short Films, a series of 13 films commissioned by the Thailand Culture Ministry's Office of Contemporary Art and Culture as a memorial tribute to the 2004 Indian Ocean earthquake and the resulting tsunami that struck Thailand. His contribution was the film Ghost of Asia.

The Thai Office of Contemporary Art and Culture also honoured Apichatpong with its 2005 Silpathorn Award for filmmaking. The annual award is given to living contemporary artists in various disciplines.

Syndromes and censorship
In 2006, Apichatpong released a feature film, Syndromes and a Century, that was commissioned by Peter Sellars for the New Crowned Hope Festival in Vienna to celebrate the 250th anniversary of Mozart's birth. It premiered at the 63rd Venice Film Festival and screened at numerous film events, such as the 2006 Toronto International Film Festival.

The film's Thai release, originally slated for 19 April 2007, was indefinitely delayed after the Thai Censorship Board demanded the removal of four scenes. Apichatpong refused to recut the film and said he would withdraw the film from domestic circulation. He explained his reasons for doing so in an article in the Bangkok Post:

Two of the "sensitive" scenes involve doctors engaging in "inappropriate" conduct (kissing and drinking liquor) in a hospital; the others depict a Buddhist monk playing a guitar and two monks playing with a remote-control flying saucer. The censors refused to return the print unless the requested cuts were made. In 2007 the film was shown twice in privately arranged screenings at the Alliance française in Bangkok.

The censorship of the film came about as a motion picture ratings system was being considered by the junta-appointed National Legislative Assembly. A replacement for the 1930 film act, the ratings law contained a restrictive ratings structure and retained the government's powers to censor and ban films it deemed would "undermine or disrupt social order and moral decency, or that might impact national security or the pride of the nation". The ratings board would comprise mainly bureaucrats in the Ministry of Culture, as well as members of the Royal Thai Police.

To oppose the draft law, Apichatpong and other directors formed the Free Thai Cinema Movement. Apichatpong was quoted as saying: "We disagree with the right of the state to ban films ... There already are other laws that cover potential wrongdoings by filmmakers." Ladda Tangsupachai, director of the Ministry of Culture's Cultural Surveillance Department, said the ratings law was needed because moviegoers in Thailand are "uneducated". She further explained, "They're not intellectuals, that's why we need ratings ... Nobody goes to see films by Apichatpong. Thai people want to see comedy. We like a laugh."

The filmmakers sought a self-regulation approach, with the founding of an independent body run by film professionals. Apichatpong had written in a commentary earlier in the year:

Free from state influence, this agency would be responsible for monitoring and assigning rating, and it would bear direct responsibilities towards the audience, who in turn would monitor the performance of the agency. This way, the film industry will be liberated from the state's shackles and begin to have a dialogue with the public.

A protest against the draft ratings law was held outside the Parliament building in Bangkok, at which Apichatpong and fellow Thai directors Wisit Sasanatieng and Pen-Ek Ratanaruang held banners that read: "No Freedom. No Democracy. No Peace" The ratings law, with the "cut-and-ban" categories left intact, was passed on 20 December 2007.

"Tomyam Pladib"
Apichatpong presented the "Apichatpong On Video Works" session as part of the "Tomyam Pladib" art exhibition that featured both Thai and Japanese artists who produced works regarding the coexistence of traditional and modern cultures. The filmmaker's presentation consisted of three short films: Ghost Of Asia, 0116643225059 and The Anthem. Apichatpong also answered questions from the audience to conclude the presentation.

The first English-language book on Apichatpong was published in March 2009. James Quandt is the editor and author of the analytical career overview that introduces the book. Other contributors include the cultural and political theorist Benedict Anderson, filmmaker Mark Cousins, art curator
Karen Newman, critics Tony Rayns and Kong Rithdee, and actress Tilda Swinton.

"Primitive", Uncle Boonmee Who Can Recall His Past Lives and Memoria
"Primitive", Apichatpong's first solo exhibition—composed of a two-channel video installation, seven single-channel videos, and two giclée prints—was first shown at Haus der Kunst in February 2009. In September 2009, the exhibition was shown in Liverpool, United Kingdom (UK) at FACT (Foundation for Art and Creative Technology). The work was commissioned by Haus der Kunst, of Munich, Germany, with FACT and Animate Projects, and was produced by Illuminations Films, London and Kick the Machine. Curator Karen Newman wrote in the introduction for the exhibition: "His works are also vehicles that take us between different worlds, asking questions about the future and revealing a much bigger story than at first appears." Primitive was shot in the border town, Nabua, where the Mekong River divides Thailand and Laos. In 2011 the New Museum presented the American debut of Primitive

In 2010 Apichatpong's feature film, Uncle Boonmee Who Can Recall His Past Lives, won the Palme d'Or at the Cannes Film Festival. The film was also selected as the Thai entry for the Best Foreign Language Film at the 83rd Academy Awards but it did not make the final shortlist.

In 2012, Apichatpong's film Mekong Hotel was screened in the Special Screenings section at the 2012 Cannes Film Festival.

In March 2013, Apichatpong and fellow Kick The Machine artist Chai Siri received the "Sharjah Biennial Prize" at the 2013 Sharjah Biennial 11 in the United Arab Emirates (UAE), alongside five other artists, including Magdi Mostafa and Fumito Urabe. Apichatpong was also awarded Japan's "Fukuoka Art and Culture Prize" in June, alongside Indian visual artist Nalini Malani, worth 3,000,000 yen (US$30,530).

In March 2014, it was announced that Apichatpong will feature among 32 directors from four continents, including Vincent Gallo and Gaspar Noé, to direct Short Plays, a soccer-themed omnibus production shot around the world. Apichatpong's short is set in his home town, features 22 shots of its lake, almost the only recognizable feature from his childhood, which are arranged like players in a soccer game.

Apichatpong's latest film, Memoria, a collaboration with Tilda Swinton, produced by Diana Bustamante and shot in Colombia in 2019, had its premiere in the 2021 Cannes Film Festival. It received the Jury Prize (ex aequo), alongside Nadav Lapid's Ahed's Knee. Apichatpong also directed a segment of The Year of the Everlasting Storm, an anthology film.

Perspectives
In a May 2013 interview for the Encounter Thailand journal, Apichatpong stated that all of his films are personal in nature and he does not consider himself a cultural ambassador for Thailand. In relation to the concept of "queer", he explained: "For me, the word queer means anything’s possible."

Filmography

Feature films

Short films and installations
Bullet (1993)
0116643225059 (1994)
Kitchen and Bedroom (1994)
Like the Relentless Fury of the Pounding Waves (1996)
Rice Artist Michael Shaowanasai's Performance (1996)
100 Years of Thai Cinema (for Thai Film Foundation, 1997)
thirdworld (1998)
The Lungara Eating Jell-O (for World Artists for Tibet, 1998)
Windows (1999)
Malee and the Boy (1999)
Boys at Noon (2000)
Boys at Noon / Girls at Night (2000)
Haunted Houses Project: Thailand (for Istanbul Biennial, 2001)
Secret Love Affair (for Tirana) (2001)
Narratives: Masumi Is a PC Operator / Fumiyo Is a Designer / I Was Sketching / Swan's Blood (for Intercross Creative Center, 2001)
Second Love in Hong Kong, co-director (2002)
Golden Ship (for the Memlingmuseum, 2002)
This and Million More Lights (for 46664, 2003)
GRAF: Tong / Love Song / Tone (2004)
It Is Possible That Only Your Heart Is Not Enough to Find You a True Love: True Love in Green / True Love in White (for Busan Biennial, 2004)
Worldly Desires (for Jeonju International Film Festival, 2004)
Ghost of Asia, co-director (for Tsunami Digital Short Films project, 2005)
Waterfall (for Solar Cinematic Art Gallery/Curtas Vila do Conde International Film Festival, 2006)
Faith (for FACT/Liverpool Biennial, 2006)
The Anthem (for LUX/Frieze Art Fair, 2006)
Unknown Forces (for REDCAT, 2007)
Luminous People (in The State of the World, 2007)
Because (2007)
My Mother's Garden (for Christian Dior, 2007)
Meteorites (for Short Films for the King Bhumibol Adulyadej's 80th Birthday, 2007)
The Palace (for National Palace Museum, 2007)
Emerald (2007)
Vampire (for Louis Vuitton, 2008)
Mobile Men (in Stories on Human Rights, 2008)
Phantoms of Nabua (for Toronto International Film Festival, 2009)
Empire (2010)
M Hotel (2011)
For Tomorrow For Tonight (2011)
The Importance of Telepathy (for Documenta, 2012)
Cactus River (for Walker Art Center, 2012) 
Mekong Hotel (for Arte, 2012)
Ashes (2012)
Sakda (Rousseau) (2012)
Dilbar (at Sharjah Biennial, 2013)
Fireworks (2014)
Fever Room (at Kunstenfestival des Arts, 2016)

Contributions
2008 Life on Mars, the 2008 Carnegie International
2011 "For Tomorrow For Tonight", Irish Museum of Modern Art
2013 "Mirage City Cinema", Sharjah Biennal 11
2013 "Photophobia", Oslo, Norway

Notes

References

Further reading
Bordeleau, Érik, Toni Pape, Ronald Rose-Antoinette and Adam Szymanski. Nocturnal Fabulations: Ecology, Vitality and Opacity in the Cinema of Apichatpong Weerasethakul Open Humanities Press, 2017.
Chaiworaporn, Anchalee (April 2006). "A Perceiver of Sense." 11th Hong Kong Independent Short Film & Video Awards.
Hunt, Matthew (May 2013). "Exclusive Interview With Apichatpong Weerasethakul".
Hunt, Matthew. Thai Cinema Uncensored Chiang Mai: Silkworm Books, 2020, .
Lim, Li Min (2 November 2006). A Thai director's elliptical view of the world, International Herald Tribune
Pansittivorakul, Thunska (19 May 2006). "A Conversation with Apichatpong Weerasethakul" .
Quandt, James (ed.), Apichatpong Weerasethakul, FilmmuseumSynemaPublikationen Vol. 12, Vienna: Austrian Film Museum, SYNEMA, 2009, .
Bjerkem, Brynjar (ed.), Apichatpong Weerasethakul: Photophobia. Oslo: TrAP, 2013. ISBN 9788299720595 With texts by Apichatpong Weerasethakul, Nach Widner, Chaisiri Jiwarangsan.

External links

 
Cargo Film Magazine video interview (German language)
Thought Catalog online magazine profile
Encounter Thailand May 2013 interview (PDF)

1970 births
Living people
Directors of Palme d'Or winners
Apichatpong Weerasethakul
Apichatpong Weerasethakul
Apichatpong Weerasethakul
Apichatpong Weerasethakul
Apichatpong Weerasethakul
Apichatpong Weerasethakul
LGBT film directors
Apichatpong Weerasethakul
Gay writers
School of the Art Institute of Chicago alumni
Apichatpong Weerasethakul
Apichatpong Weerasethakul
21st-century LGBT people
Postmodernist filmmakers